Srbice is a municipality and village in Teplice District in the Ústí nad Labem Region of the Czech Republic. It has about 500 inhabitants.

Notable people
Ruth von Mayenburg (1907–1993), Austrian journalist, writer and translator

References

Villages in Teplice District